The 2023 Solheim Cup is the 18th edition of the Solheim Cup matches, and will be held from 22 to 24 September at the Finca Cortesin in Casares, Andalusia, Spain. The Solheim Cup is a biennial team competition between the top women professional golfers from Europe and the United States. Stacy Lewis will captain the U.S. team for the first time and Suzann Pettersen will captain the European team for the first time.

The previous competition in 2021 was won by Europe with 15 points to 13.

The next Solheim Cup tournament will switch back to being hosted in even-numbered years (the first time since 2002) starting in 2024, as the Ryder Cup moved to an odd-year schedule after the 2020 competition was postponed due to the COVID-19 pandemic.

Format 
The competition is a three-day match play event between teams of twelve players with a similar format to the Ryder Cup, with each match worth one point. The format is as follows:

 Day 1 (Saturday): Four foursome (alternate shot) matches in a morning session and four fourball (better ball) matches in an afternoon session. A total of eight players from each team participate in each session.
 Day 2 (Sunday): Four foursome (alternate shot) matches in a morning session and four fourball (better ball) matches in an afternoon session. A total of eight players from each team participate in each session.
 Day 3 (Monday): 12 singles matches. All 12 players from each team participate.

With a total of 28 points, 14 points are required to win the Cup, and 14 points are required for the defending champion to retain the Cup. All matches are played to a maximum of 18 holes. If the score is even after 18 holes, each team earns one-half point.

Team qualification and selection

Eligibility criteria 
The European and United States teams had different eligibility criteria:

Team Europe

Members of the European team must:

 be current members of the Ladies European Tour in any category or membership;
 have played in eight Ranking Events (excluding the Excluded Championships) during the Qualifying Period as a member of the LET, unless the relevant player has been selected by the appointed captain for the 2023 European Team;
 must be a "European national". To be a "European national", the player must satisfy the criteria set out in the "Nationality Policy" issued by the International Golf Federation.

Points allocation is doubled starting in the year of the event (2023).

Team USA

Members of the United States team must be current members of the LPGA Tour and meet one of these three citizenship criteria:

 U.S. citizens by birth, regardless of their birthplace.
 Those who were naturalized as U.S. citizens before age 18.
 Those who became U.S. citizens by adoption before age 13.

Team selection 
The European and United States teams are selected by different methods.

Team Europe

Team Europe consists of the top two players from the LET Solheim Cup standings, followed by the top six LET members on the Women's World Golf Rankings who were not already qualified via the Solheim Cup standings, and four captain's selections.

Team USA

Team USA consists of the leading seven players from the LPGA Solheim Cup points rankings, the top two players in the Women's World Golf Rankings not already qualified via the points rankings and three chosen by the team captain. LPGA Solheim Cup points are earned for top-20 finishes on the LPGA Tour over a two-year period.

Teams 
Ages on first day of matches, 22 September; Rolex rankings at team selection. Captain's picks shown in yellow.

Day one 
Saturday, 22 September 2023

Morning foursomes

Afternoon four-ball

Day two 
Sunday, 23 September 2023

Morning foursomes

Afternoon four-ball

Day three 
Monday, 24 September 2023

Singles

Individual player records 
Each entry refers to the win–loss–half record of the player.

Europe

United States

References

External links 
 

Solheim Cup
Golf tournaments in Spain